Daysland is a town in central Alberta, Canada.

History 
The community was named for its founder and first mayor, Edgerton W. Day, who purchased  of land from the CPR in 1904 to form the basis of Daysland.

Demographics 

In the 2016 Census of Population conducted by Statistics Canada, the Town of Daysland recorded a population of 824 people living in 330 of its 356 total private dwellings, a  change from its 2011 population of 807.

Notable people 
Richard Petiot, professional hockey player
Matthew Spiller, professional hockey player
Dick Beddoes, sportscaster and journalist

See also 
List of communities in Alberta
List of towns in Alberta

References

External links 

1906 establishments in Alberta
Towns in Alberta